Striatorsidis striatipennis is a species of beetle in the family Cerambycidae, and the only species in the genus Striatorsidis. It was described by Stephan von Breuning in 1960.

References

Lamiini
Beetles described in 1960